The David Rall Medal is an award given annually by the National Academy of Medicine of the United States to one of its members who "...has demonstrated distinguished leadership as chair of a study committee or other such activity, showing commitment above and beyond the usual responsibilities of the position." It is named in honor of the late David Rall, the former director of the National Institute of Environmental Health Sciences. The first award was given in 2000.

Recipients
2000 - Stuart Bondurant
2001 - Dorothy P. Rice
2002 - Joshua Lederberg
2003 - Daniel Federman
2004 - Marie McCormick
2005 - Torsten N. Wiesel
2006 - Fitzhugh Mullan
2007 - William C. Richardson
2008 - Sheila Burke
2009 - Bernard Guyer
2010 - Nancy Adler
2011 - Virginia Stallings
2012 - Linda Rosenstock
2013 - Ellen Wright Clayton
2014 - Richard B. Johnston, Jr.
2015 - Jonathan Samet
2016 - Donna Shalala
2017 - Richard O. Hynes
2018 - Hedvig Hricak
2019 - David Savitz
2020 - David Eaton

See also

 List of medicine awards

References

External links
Page at the National Academy of Medicine website

Awards established in 2000
Medicine awards